The list of shipwrecks in August 1834 includes ships sunk, foundered, wrecked, grounded or otherwise lost during August 1834.

1 August

2 August

3 August

4 August

5 August

6 August

7 August

8 August

9 August

10 August

12 August

13 August

14 August

15 August

16 August

20 August

22 August

25 August

26 August

27 August

28 August

30 August

31 August

Unknown date

References

1834-08